Doetinchem is a city and municipality in the east of the Netherlands. It is situated along the Oude IJssel (Old IJssel) river in a part of the province of Gelderland called the Achterhoek. This makes Doetinchem the largest town (by population) in the Achterhoek.

On 1 January 2005, a municipal restructuring merged the neighbouring municipality of Wehl as well as the Zelhelmse Broek area with Doetinchem.

Population centres
The local government organization in the Netherlands is complex and fine-grained (see municipality and Govt Stats, with municipalities being divided into various entities. The municipality of Doetinchem consists of:

The city ('stad'):
 Doetinchem
The neighborhoods ('wijken'): 
 Centrum
 Bezelhorst
 Dichteren
 Overstegen
 De Huet
 De Hoop
 Oosseld
 Schöneveld & Muziekbuurt
The townships ('buurtschappen'):

 Gaanderen
 Wehl
 IJzevoorde
 Langerak
 
 Nieuw-Wehl

Wehl was a separate municipality (with about 6,750 inhabitants, including Nieuw-Wehl) until 31 December 2004, when it merged with the municipality of Doetinchem.

History

It is known from archaeological finds of skulls, pottery shards, and flint arrowheads that the area was inhabited more than 11,000 years ago. These prehistoric hunters were followed by Celtic and Germanic tribes like the Franks and Saxons. Roman coins have been found and there is also archaeological evidence of the Vikings having plundered the area.

The first reference to the name of Doetinchem comes in a document from the year 838 which mentions a 'villa Duetinghem', a settlement with a small church. In 887, there is another mention of 'Deutinkem', a fortress with a church which had been given to the then Bishop of Utrecht. The spelling has varied over the centuries, with 'Duttichem', 'Duichingen' and 'Deutekom' being just some examples.

For a long time, Doetinchem remained a small place but around 1100 it started to grow and, after suffering several attempts by plunderers, a town wall was built. In 1236, Doetinchem was granted city rights ('stadsrechten') by Count Otto II of Gelre and Zutphen, and in return, the town provided taxes and soldiers for the Count's army. Also, the new city council published rules for the city, codified in the 'Keurboek van Doetinchem' (Rulebook of Doetinchem), which laid down severe punishments for infringements.

In 1226, Doetinchem faced increasing danger from plunderers, and so the city wall was raised by a metre. There were four barriers in the wall which, being weak points, were replaced over time by four large city-gates known as the Hamburgerpoort (built 1302), the Waterpoort, the Gruitpoort, and the Hezenpoort. Later a moat was dug around the wall and a rampart was built in front; the city's central windmill, the 'walmolen' (Dutch 'wal'=rampart, 'molen'=mill), stands on the remains of this rampart. Despite these defences, Doetinchem was besieged many times and during the Eighty Years' War (1568–1648). It was besieged and conquered twice. However, eventually the walls became seen as redundant (or perhaps ineffective) and in 1672, they were torn down. However, it was not until the second half of the 19th century that the city gates and most of the rampart were removed.

From its early years, Doetinchem had been an important marketplace for farmers to sell their wares; the market was held in the central square called the Simonsplein right up until the Second World War.

Doetinchem has had its fair share of disasters. Apart from the sieges mentioned above, in 1527 a large fire destroyed most of the city including the city archives (which means that many earlier dates in the history of Doetinchem are somewhat unreliable), and in 1580 most of the city was killed by a plague. There was also occasional flooding. However, despite the fact that Doetinchem is only  from the German border, because the Netherlands was not involved in the First World War, Doetinchem saw nothing more than the posting of a few border guards during that time. Even during the Second World War, Doetinchem came off fairly lightly at first; there was only a small German occupying force and the city even escaped the worst effects of the Hunger Winter. However, some prisoners were executed after being implicated in the shooting death in Putten of an important German officer by the Dutch Resistance and disastrously, in March and April 1945, the centre of Doetinchem was largely destroyed by Allied bombing which was either intended for nearby German towns or, as some say, was to destroy the German defences in Doetinchem. Which of the two is true has never really been clarified and there is still some discussion about the true intentions of the bombardment. The city itself was liberated by The Calgary Highlanders in 1945 after a brief battle there.

In 2018 a writer called Karel Berkhuysen researched the Allied bombing. He found that the Germans were researching nuclear fission in a converted school. This information was then passed to the Allies.

In the decades after the war, Doetinchem grew and in a few years had outgrown its "competitors" in the Achterhoek, namely Doesburg, Winterswijk and Zutphen. The Dutch company, Philips, had a factory for some years in the city. From 2003 till 2005, the city grew enormously as new districts such as Dichteren were built, and as Doetinchem incorporates outlying villages such as Wehl into its municipality. In 2011, the city is still growing. By building a new district as het Loo and Isseldoks, and the opening of a brand new theatre and cinema, Doetinchem is the biggest growing city in Gelderland.

Significant structures in Doetinchem 
The main church in the central square, St Catherine's Church ('Catharinakerk') was virtually destroyed in the World War II bombing and restoration took from 1948 to 1963. Although originally a Roman Catholic church, it became Dutch Reformed in 1591. There are two castles, 'De Kelder' ('The Cellar') and Slangenburg.

The city has three windmills. In the city centre, there is the already mentioned De Walmolen, the bottom of which now houses the city's tourist office. In Dichteren, there is a mill called Aurora (Latin for 'dawn') and to the east of the city a mill called Benninkmolen. All these mills are open to visitors, usually open to all one weekday morning and at other times by appointment.

A few other important buildings in the city are the Amphion-Theater, the Gruitpoort, a big cultural centre, the Rietveld Lyceum, the biggest high school in Doetinchem and the Tax administration office.

Sport
Doetinchem has a professional football team, De Graafschap ('The County'). The home of De Graafschap was completely revamped to transform it into an all-seater arena. The stands are fully covered, with the roof painted in the blue and white of the club.

The city has an indoor swimming pool, Rozengaarde. In April or May, a local evening four-day marathon is organized.

Since 2005 a four-day marathon is organised which starts and ends in Doetinchem and runs through the Achterhoek. The marathon was held from 23 August to the 26th. Almost 15.000 people took part.

In 2009 the city's volleyball team took part in the CEV cup playing against Haltbank Ankara from Turkey.

Festivals
Doetinchem has an annual street-theatre festival Buitengewoon (Extraordinary), and the City Festival, a big festival with music acts, theatre, a carnival and fireworks.

Notable residents 

 Frederik Johan van Baer, Lord of Slangenburg (1645–1713) a Dutch military officer
 Carel Hendrik Ver Huell (born 1764) a Dutch and later French admiral and statesman
 Geert Dales, Dutch Wiki (born 1952) a Dutch politician with 50PLUS
 Jan Rietman, Dutch Wiki (born 1952), a pianist and presenter on radio & TV
 Maria Martens (born 1955), politician, Member of the European Parliament (MEP) 1999 to 2009
 Thomas Rosenboom (born 1956) a Dutch author of novels and short stories
 Henriette de Swart (born 1961) a Dutch linguist and academic
 John Hondorp (born 1964) jazz organist and teaches the Hammond organ as an academic
 Wilke te Brummelstroete (born ca.1975) a Dutch mezzo-soprano
 Rianne Letschert (born 1976) a Dutch law scholar, Rector of Maastricht University
 Jesse Mateman (born 1996) a Dutch man that attended Nijmegen and notably survived terror attacks in Barcelona in 2017
 Janouk Kelderman (born 1991) a Dutch actor, singer and television presenter

Sport 

 Desi Reijers (born 1964), freestyle swimmer, competed at the 1984 Summer Olympics 
 Paul Bosvelt (born 1970), a Dutch former professional footballer with 523 club caps
 Chris Bruil (born 1970), badminton player, competed at the 2004 Summer Olympics
 Rogier Meijer (born 1981) a Dutch former footballer, 253 club caps with De Graafschap 
 Glenn Loovens (born 1983), a Dutch professional footballer with nearly 400 club caps
 Sanne Keizer (born 1985), a Dutch beach volleyball player
 Marloes Wesselink (born 1987), a Dutch professional beach volleyball player
 Siem de Jong (born 1989), a Dutch professional footballer with 250 club caps
 Luuk de Jong (born 1990), a Dutch professional footballer with over 300 club caps 
 Jelle van Gorkom (born 1991) a Dutch BMX racing cyclist, silver medalist at the 2016 Summer Olympics
 Richèl Hogenkamp (born 1992), a Dutch professional tennis player 
 Siri Worm (born 1992), a Dutch women's football defender
 Alexander Büttner (born 1989),  a Dutch professional footballer for De Graafschap

Local media
Newspapers available in Doetinchem include subscription paper "De Gelderlander" and free papers "Doetinchems Vizier" and "Zondag", all published by Koninklijke Wegener NV. Doetinchem has its own television station called 'Stadstv' which is received by cable in the municipalities of Doetinchem itself and the neighbouring Hummelo en Keppel, and a television station called 'GraafschapTV' which is received in the entire Achterhoek region.

Transport 
Doetinchem has been connected to the Dutch national highway system since November 1974, when the Zevenaar-Doetinchem section of Highway 15 (A15) was opened. This section was extended to Varsseveld in 1984. Today the A15 is called the A18.

Doetinchem is served by rail services from Arnhem by the regional train to Winterswijk with two stations, one in the city centre – Doetinchem and Doetinchem De Huet lying to the west between the suburbs of De Huet and Dichteren. Doetinchem receives four trains per hour to Arnhem (Monday to Friday) and there are always 2 trains per hour between Arnhem and Winterswijk. In 2012, Arriva, took over the rail services between Arnhem and Winterswijk from NS and Syntus

Bus services are also operated by Arriva.

Gallery

References

External links 

 
Municipalities of Gelderland
Populated places in Gelderland
Cities in the Netherlands
Achterhoek